Delos Carleton Emmons (January 17, 1889 – October 3, 1965) was a lieutenant general in the United States Army. Essentially a "desk general," he was the military governor of Hawaii in the aftermath of the Attack on Pearl Harbor and administered the replacement of normal U.S. banknotes with special war-emergency US banknotes in case the islands were invaded. He is credited with preventing the mass evacuation of Japanese-Americans from Hawaii, which many have called a shameful episode of racism and jingoism that was felt hardest on the mainland.

Biography
He was born on January 17, 1889, in Huntington, West Virginia. He graduated from the United States Military Academy in June 1909 and was commissioned an infantry second lieutenant. Emmons was assigned as commanding officer of Company B, 30th Infantry Regiment at the Presidio of San Francisco and in May 1912 went to Fort Gibbon, Alaska with the 30th. He returned to Plattsburg Barracks, New York.

He became a first lieutenant in July 1916 and was detailed to the Signal Corps' Aviation Section for pilot training in August 1916. He was rated a junior military aviator in May 1917 and became a captain in July. Emmons next served as aeronautical officer of the Western Department at San Francisco and in December went to Washington as assistant executive in the Office of the Chief Signal Officer. The following June, Emmons was promoted to major and went to Mather Field, California. He became a lieutenant colonel in August and in December was transferred to McCook Field in Dayton, Ohio as assistant chief of the Engineering Division.

Emmons transferred to the U.S. Army Air Service in July 1920 and a year later completed the Air Service Course at Harvard University. He returned to McCook Field for three years as chief of Production Engineering. Emmons went to Crissy Field, California in August 1924, where he served as commanding officer, and then to Rockwell Field as commanding officer of the 91st Observation Squadron. He went to Washington, D.C., in August 1927 as executive officer for the chief of the Air Corps. He held the same assignment for the Assistant Secretary of War for Air, F. Trubee Davison, in October 1928. Emmons graduated from the Air Corps Tactical School at Maxwell Air Force Base, Alabama, and the Command and General Staff School at Fort Leavenworth, Kansas.

Emmons was concurrently commanding officer of the 18th Composite Wing and Air Officer of the Hawaiian Department at Fort Shafter in the Hawaiian Islands from March 1934 to July 1936. He became a colonel in March 1935. Emmons returned to the United States in July 1936 as commander of the 1st Wing, General Headquarters Air Force, at March Field, California, with promotion to brigadier general. Emmons received his second star in March 1939 as part of his appointment as commander of the GHQ Air Force at Langley Field, Virginia, succeeding Col. Frank Andrews, who was not reappointed after four years in the position and was returned to his permanent rank.

After the fall of France, the Americans and British increased their military cooperation; Emmons was one of three American military observers sent to London on August 6, 1940. He was promoted to lieutenant general in November 1940 when Army General Headquarters was activated, to make him equal in grade to the field army commanders of GHQ. He retained his command when GHQ Air Force was renamed Air Force Combat Command in June 1941 and made a part of the new United States Army Air Forces. This however caused command difficulties since he was now superior in rank to his boss, Major General Henry Arnold, the new Chief of the Army Air Forces.

Emmons was returned by Arnold to Hawaii as commanding general of the Hawaiian Department on December 17, ten days after the attack on Pearl Harbor. He organized the replacement of the island's U.S. banknotes with new dollars overprinted with the word HAWAII; if the area were occupied, U.S. authorities could declare all marked dollars void and thereby render worthless all money which fell into enemy hands (by their capture of banks, businesses, etc.). He also requested Army Air Force Headquarters to send additional planes and received them as rapidly as possible. Emmons built up the forces in Hawaii, anticipating the Battle of Midway. This was the only combat command he held during the war. Emmons promised the local Japanese American community in Hawaii that they would be treated fairly so long as they remained loyal to the United States, and he succeeded in blocking efforts to relocate them to the outer islands or mainland in internment camps by pointing out the logistical difficulties.

Returning to the United States in June 1943, Emmons was assigned three months later as commanding general of the Western Defense Command at the Presidio of San Francisco. Emmons headed the Alaskan Department at Fort Richardson from June 1944 until June 1946. He became commandant of the Armed Forces Staff College at Norfolk, Virginia, in August 1946 and remained in that position until he retired June 30, 1948.

Awards and decorations

General Emmons' awards and decorations include the Army Distinguished Service Medal with two Oak Leaf Clusters; Legion of Merit with Oak Leaf Cluster; Distinguished Flying Cross; Air Medal with Oak Leaf Cluster; American Defense Service Medal with Foreign Service Clasp; American Campaign Medal; Asiatic-Pacific Campaign Medal with Bronze Star; World War I Victory Medal; World War II Victory Medal; Mexican Border Service Medal.

References and notes

External links
 Densho Encyclopedia article on Emmons as Military Governor and preventing mass removal of Japanese Hawaiians

1880s births
1965 deaths
United States Army Infantry Branch personnel
Military personnel from Huntington, West Virginia
Harvard University alumni
United States Military Academy alumni
United States Army Air Forces personnel of World War II
Recipients of the Distinguished Service Medal (US Army)
Recipients of the Legion of Merit
Recipients of the Distinguished Flying Cross (United States)
Recipients of the Air Medal
United States Army Command and General Staff College alumni
Air Corps Tactical School alumni
United States Army Air Forces generals
Burials at Arlington National Cemetery